Šljivovik (Serbian Cyrillic: Шљивовик) is a mountain in southern Serbia, near the town of Bela Palanka. Its highest peak Šljivovički vrh has an elevation of 1258 meters above sea level.

References

Mountains of Serbia